The 1959 The Citadel Bulldogs football team represented The Citadel, The Military College of South Carolina in the 1959 NCAA University Division football season.  Eddie Teague served as head coach for the third season.  The Bulldogs played as members of the Southern Conference and played home games at Johnson Hagood Stadium.

Schedule

NFL Draft selection

References

Citadel Bulldogs
The Citadel Bulldogs football seasons
Citadel football